The 2019–20 Indiana State Sycamores men's basketball team represented Indiana State University in the 2019–20 NCAA Division I men's basketball season. The Sycamores, led by 10th-year head coach Greg Lansing, played their home games at the Hulman Center in Terre Haute, Indiana as members of the Missouri Valley Conference. They finished the season 18–12, 11–7 in MVC play to finish in a tie for third place. They lost in the quarterfinals of the MVC tournament to Missouri State.

Previous season
The Sycamores finished the 2018–19 season 15–16, 7–11 in MVC play to finish in a tie for eighth place. As the No. 8 seed in the MVC tournament, they lost to Valparaiso in the first round.

Roster

During the season
ISU coach Greg Lansing began the season with 148 wins, which places him second on the ISU Coaching Leaderboard, the leader Duane Klueh has 182. Junior Guard Tyreke Key became the 40th member of the ISU 1,000-pt Club; on December 30, 2019, vs. Southern Illinois, Key dropped 20 points to surpass 1,000 career points. Key reached the 1,000 point mark in just 73 career games which is the fourth-fastest pace in program history.

As of January 29, Key had 8 games in which he scored 20 or more points and led the Sycamores with a 17.2 ppg.  On February 16; Jordan Barnes recorded 2 steals during the game, giving him 129 for his career.  Barnes became the only player in 125-seasons of Sycamore Basketball to reach the Top 10 in scoring (1,496), 3-pt FGs (265), assists (369) & steals (129).

As of March 2, Lansing has reached 166 wins, 91 MVC wins (the 11th highest total in MVC history. Jordan Barnes has increased his career totals; 1,544 points, 271 3-pointers, 383 assists and 134 steals.  Tyreke Key has climbed to #19 on the ISU career scoring charts.

Schedule and results

|-
!colspan=12 style=|Non-conference regular season

|-
!colspan=12 style=|Missouri Valley regular season

|-
!colspan=12 style=| MVC tournament
|-

|-

Source

References

Indiana State Sycamores men's basketball seasons
Indiana State Sycamores
Indiana State Sycamores men's basketball
Indiana State Sycamores men's basketball